Toby Thurstans (born 14 August 1980) is a former Australian rules footballer who played for the Port Adelaide Football Club in the Australian Football League (AFL).

Career
Thurstans was drafted from the Dandenong Stingrays at selection 39 in the 1998 National AFL Draft. He could not get a game and played in the South Australian National Football League (SANFL) for Sturt until his AFL debut for Port Adelaide in Round 1, 2003 versus West Coast Eagles at Subiaco. Thurstans won Port's best first year player award for season 2003. The following season he played all 25 games, kicked 28 goals, played in the 2004 AFL Grand Final and was one of three players to kick three or more goals in Port's 40 point Grand Final win over the Brisbane Lions.

In 2005 and 2006, Thurstans struggled to find the form he had in 2004 and was used as trade bait at the end of the 2006 season but remained with Port Adelaide.

Thurstans played all 25 games for Port in 2007, starring in his new role as a defender, getting back to the form he displayed in 2004.

Retirement
Thurstans announced his retirement from Port Adelaide on Thursday 3 September 2009, after playing 110 games for the club since his debut in 2003. Thurstans retired as a Life Member of the Port Adelaide Football Club, citing his decision to retire had been coming for a while, despite some good form throughout the 2009 season: "The mental and physical rigours of an AFL season demand so much, and I am not the sort of person who is going to go on unless I think I can contribute 100 percent."

Port Adelaide coach Mark Williams says Toby's career highlights to young players how persistence can pay off.
"Toby retires with an AFL premiership medal after waiting four years to play his first game," Williams said. "And he didn’t just play in that Grand Final – he played really well."

Playing statistics

|- style="background-color: #EAEAEA"
! scope="row" style="text-align:center" | 2003
|style="text-align:center;"|
| 28 || 10 || 4 || 2 || 49 || 24 || 73 || 31 || 13 || 0.4 || 0.2 || 4.9 || 2.4 || 7.3 || 3.1 || 1.3
|-
! scope="row" style="text-align:center;" | 2004
|style="text-align:center;"|
| 28 || 25 || 24 || 13 || 125 || 103 || 228 || 99 || 39 || 1.0 || 0.5 || 5.0 || 4.1 || 9.1 || 4.0 || 1.6
|- style="background-color: #EAEAEA"
! scope="row" style="text-align:center" | 2005
|style="text-align:center;"|
| 28 || 10 || 7 || 1 || 56 || 34 || 90 || 49 || 16 || 0.7 || 0.1 || 5.6 || 3.4 || 9.0 || 4.9 || 1.6
|-
! scope="row" style="text-align:center" | 2006
|style="text-align:center;"|
| 28 || 13 || 15 || 8 || 73 || 57 || 130 || 67 || 30 || 1.2 || 0.6 || 5.6 || 4.4 || 10.0 || 5.2 || 2.3
|- style="background-color: #EAEAEA"
! scope="row" style="text-align:center" | 2007
|style="text-align:center;"|
| 28 || 25 || 0 || 1 || 145 || 162 || 307 || 124 || 56 || 0.0 || 0.0 || 5.8 || 6.5 || 12.3 || 5.0 || 2.2
|-
! scope="row" style="text-align:center" | 2008
|style="text-align:center;"|
| 28 || 16 || 5 || 0 || 107 || 131 || 238 || 83 || 32 || 0.3 || 0.0 || 6.7 || 8.2 || 14.9 || 5.2 || 2.0
|- style="background-color: #EAEAEA"
! scope="row" style="text-align:center" | 2009
|style="text-align:center;"|
| 28 || 11 || 0 || 5 || 87 || 103 || 190 || 61 || 26 || 0.0 || 0.5 || 7.9 || 9.4 || 17.3 || 5.5 || 2.4
|- class="sortbottom"
! colspan=3| Career
! 110
! 55
! 30
! 642
! 614
! 1256
! 514
! 212
! 0.5
! 0.3
! 5.8
! 5.6
! 11.4
! 4.7
! 1.9
|}

References

External links

Toby Thurstans Profile

Port Adelaide Football Club players
Port Adelaide Football Club Premiership players
Port Adelaide Football Club players (all competitions)
1980 births
Living people
Australian rules footballers from Victoria (Australia)
Dandenong Stingrays players
Sturt Football Club players
One-time VFL/AFL Premiership players